S66 may refer to:
 S66 (Long Island bus)
 S66 (New York City bus) serving Staten Island
 Awabakal language
 Daihatsu Hijet (S66), a Japanese kei truck
 Explorer S-66, a failed American spacecraft
 Savoia-Marchetti S.66, an Italian flying boat
 S66, a postcode district for Rotherham, England
 Siemens S66, a Siemens mobile phone